Kohlman is a surname. Notable people with the surname include:

Churchill Kohlman (1906–1983), American songwriter
Freddie Kohlman (1918–1990), American musician
Joe Kohlman (1913–1974), American baseball player
Lynn Kohlman (1946–2008), American model, photographer and writer

See also
Kohlmann